The 2005 Zentiva Czech Indoor Open was a women's tennis tournament played on indoor hard courts in Průhonice, Czech Republic that was part of the 2005 ITF Women's Circuit. It was the first edition of the tournament and was held from 14 to 20 November 2005.

Lucie Hradecká won the title, defeating Agnieszka Radwańska in the final, 4–6, 6–1, 7–6(10–8).

Seeds

Draw

Finals

Top half

Bottom half

References
Main Draw

2005 ITF Women's Circuit
Czech Indoor Open